Puerto Rico Highway 385 (PR-385) is a tertiary state highway in Peñuelas, Puerto Rico. At its northern terminus it connects with PR-132, in the town of Peñuelas, and at its southern terminus it connects to PR-2, near the Caribbean Sea. Both terminus and the entire length of the road are all within the municipality of Peñuelas.

Major intersections

See also

 List of highways numbered 385

References

External links
 

385
Peñuelas, Puerto Rico